The Goa Legislative Assembly is the unicameral legislature of the Indian state of Goa.

The seat of the Legislative Assembly is at Porvorim. The term of the Legislative Assembly is five years, unless dissolved earlier. Presently, it comprises 40 members who are directly elected from single-seat constituencies. 1 constituency is reserved for candidates of the Scheduled Castes.

List of constituencies

References

Goa

Goa Legislative Assembly
Goa-related lists